Outlaws of the Plains is a 1946 American Western film directed by Sam Newfield and starring Buster Crabbe, Al St. John and Patti McCarty.

Cast
 Buster Crabbe as Billy Carson 
 Al St. John as Fuzzy Q. Jones 
 Patti McCarty as Kitty Reed 
 Charles King as Nord Finner 
 Karl Hackett as Henry Reed 
 Jack O'Shea as Ralph Emory 
 Bud Osborne as Sheriff 
 Budd Buster as Tom Wilson 
 Roy Brent as Townsman 
 Slim Whitaker as Graham - Railroad Agent

See also
The "Billy the Kid" films starring Buster Crabbe: 
 Billy the Kid Wanted (1941)
 Billy the Kid's Round-Up (1941)
 Billy the Kid Trapped (1942)
 Billy the Kid's Smoking Guns (1942)
 Law and Order (1942) 
 Sheriff of Sage Valley (1942) 
 The Mysterious Rider (1942)
 The Kid Rides Again (1943)
 Fugitive of the Plains (1943)
 Western Cyclone (1943)
 Cattle Stampede (1943)
 The Renegade (1943)
 Blazing Frontier (1943)
 Devil Riders (1943)
 Frontier Outlaws (1944)
 Valley of Vengeance (1944)
 The Drifter (1944) 
 Fuzzy Settles Down (1944)
 Rustlers' Hideout (1944)
 Wild Horse Phantom (1944)
 Oath of Vengeance (1944)
 His Brother's Ghost (1945) 
 Thundering Gunslingers (1945)
 Shadows of Death (1945)
 Gangster's Den (1945)
 Stagecoach Outlaws (1945)
 Border Badmen (1945)
 Fighting Bill Carson (1945)
 Prairie Rustlers (1945) 
 Lightning Raiders (1945)
 Terrors on Horseback (1946)
 Gentlemen with Guns (1946)
 Ghost of Hidden Valley (1946)
 Prairie Badmen (1946)
 Overland Riders (1946)
 Outlaws of the Plains (1946)

References

Bibliography
 Jerry Vermilye. Buster Crabbe: A Biofilmography. McFarland, 2014.

External links
 

1946 films
1946 Western (genre) films
1940s English-language films
American Western (genre) films
Films directed by Sam Newfield
Producers Releasing Corporation films
American black-and-white films
1940s American films